Sally Svendelin (born 19 November 1939) is a former archer who represented Switzerland at the 1972 Summer Olympic Games in archery.

Olympics 

Svendelin competed in the women's individual event and finished 33rd with a score of 2191 points.

References

External links 

 Profile on worldarchery.org

1939 births
Living people
Swiss female archers
Olympic archers of Switzerland
Archers at the 1972 Summer Olympics